is a Japanese footballer currently playing as a midfielder for Okinawa SV.

Career statistics

Club
.

Notes

References

External links

1999 births
Living people
Association football people from Yamagata Prefecture
Japanese footballers
Association football midfielders
J2 League players
Tochigi SC players
Okinawa SV players